Concurrent logic programming is a variant of logic programming in which programs are sets of guarded Horn clauses of the form:

Declaratively, guarded Horn clauses are read as ordinary logical implications:

However, procedurally, when there are several clauses whose heads  match a given goal, then all of the clauses are executed in parallel, checking whether their  guards  hold. If the guards of more than one clause hold, then a committed choice is made to one of the clauses, and execution proceeds with the subgoals   of the chosen clause. These subgoals can also be executed in parallel. Thus concurrent logic programming implements a form of "don't care nondeterminism", rather
than "don't know nondeterminism".

History
The first concurrent logic programming language was the Relational Language of Clark and Gregory, which was an offshoot of IC-Prolog. Later versions of concurrent logic programming include Shapiro's Concurrent Prolog and Ueda's Guarded Horn Clause language.

The development of concurrent logic programming was given an impetus when GHC was used to implement KL1, the systems programming language of the Japanese Fifth Generation Project (FGCS). The FGCS Project was a $400M initiative by Japan's Ministry of International Trade and Industry, begun in 1982, to use massively parallel computing/processing for artificial intelligence applications. The choice of concurrent logic programming as the “missing link” between the hardware and the applications was influenced by a visit to the FGCS Project in 1982 by Ehud Shapiro, who invented Concurrent Prolog.

See also
 Concurrent constraint logic programming
 Logic programming
 Nondeterministic programming

References
 Clark, K. L. and Gregory, S. (1981). A relational language for parallel programming. In Proceedings of the 1981 conference on Functional programming languages and computer architecture (pp. 171-178). ACM.

Programming paradigms
Logic programming